Adnan Al-Hakim (died May 26, 1990) was the leader of the Najjadeh Party, an Arab nationalist party in Lebanon, for more than 30 years. He defined the politics of the party significantly. He was elected to parliament in 1956, and again in 1960 and 1968.

Gallery

References

External links
Najjadeh Party Official Website
Adnan Hakim Photogallery
Najjadeh party history 

1990 deaths
Lebanese Arab nationalists
Members of the Parliament of Lebanon
Najjadeh Party politicians
Year of birth missing
Fascist politicians